Cahuzac-sur-Vère (literally Cahuzac on Vère) is a commune in the Tarn department in southern France. The people of Cahuzac are called Cahuzacois.

Geography
The Vère flows westward through the middle of the commune and crosses the village.

See also
Communes of the Tarn department

References

Communes of Tarn (department)